Jerry Yeo (born 29 June 1986) is a Singaporean actor. He was a versatile full-time Mediacorp artiste, actor and TV host from 2007 to 2014.

Career
Yeo joined Star Search 2007 whilst a freshman at Nanyang Technological University and was first runner-up. He was signed by MediaCorp but played only minor roles for some time due to his studies.

Yeo was nominated for the Best Newcomer Award in 2009. He garnered critical acclaim for his role as the unscrupulous, wealthy young villain Ye Rende in The Ultimatum despite the lukewarm reviews the series received. At the 2010 Star Awards he won the audience poll for the Most Memorable Villain and was nominated for the Best Supporting Actor. After graduating from NTU he signed with MediaCorp as a full-time artiste.

In August 2014, felt underrated, he left MediaCorp, but continued to take on ad-hoc acting jobs. In 2015, he joined Scoot and is presently a full-time commercial pilot. He has said that he would be happy to return to acting should the opportunity arise.

Personal life
Yeo was educated at Anglican High School and Victoria Junior College. He graduated from the NTU Wee Kim Wee School of Communications in July 2012.

Filmography

Shows

Awards and nominations

References

External links
Profile on xin.msn.com

Living people
1986 births
Singaporean male television actors
Victoria Junior College alumni
Nanyang Technological University alumni